Hammersmith Odeon is a triple album by Frank Zappa, recorded on January 25, 26 & 27, 1978 and February 28, 1978, and released posthumously in 2010 by the Zappa Family Trust. It is the fifth installment on the Vaulternative Records label that is dedicated to the posthumous release of complete Zappa concerts, following the releases of FZ:OZ (2002), Buffalo (2007), Wazoo (2007) and Philly '76 (2009).

History 
Frank Zappa played London's Hammersmith Odeon five times in 1978: on 24, 25, 26 & 27 January 1978 and on 28 February 1978.

The 25, 26 & 27 January 1978 and 28 February 1978 concerts provided the source for the basic tracks for Zappa's 1979 album Sheik Yerbouti.

The Hammersmith Odeon 3-CD set was designed to celebrate Frank Zappa's 70th birthday on 21 December 2010. Mixed in NYC by Frank Filipetti, none of the tracks have been previously released and the track listing mirrors and/or parallels the set lists of the concerts.

Track listing

Personnel 
 Frank Zappa – lead guitar, vocals
 Adrian Belew – guitar, vocals
 Tommy Mars – keyboards, vocals
 Peter Wolf – keyboards
 Patrick O'Hearn – bass, vocals
 Terry Bozzio – drums, vocals
 Ed Mann – percussion

References

External links 
 
 Hammersmith Odeon album at Discogs.com

2010 live albums
Frank Zappa live albums
Live albums published posthumously
Albums recorded at the Hammersmith Apollo